An Evening You Will Forget for the Rest of Your Life is a 2018 American stand-up comedy show written and performed by comedians Steve Martin and Martin Short and directed by Marcus Raboy. The special received four Primetime Emmy Award nominations, and a Directors Guild of America Award nomination.

Premise 
Comedians and writers Steve Martin and Martin Short perform a live comedy set with music by The Steep Canyon Rangers and jazz pianist, Jeff Babko, at the Peace Center in Greenville, South Carolina.

Production 
The special entitled, Steve Martin and Martin Short: An Evening You Will Forget for the Rest of Your Life was taped at the Peace Center in Greenville. It features new comedy bits, musical sketches and conversations about the two old friends’ long careers, most memorable encounters and their lives in showbiz.

About the release, Steve Martin joked on Twitter, "Now we're like Chris Rock and Dave Chappelle except for the pay!"

Release 
The special was released on Netflix streaming platform on May 25, 2018.

Reception 
The special has received 100% on Rotten Tomatoes with the critics consensus reading, "Brimming with sidesplitting laughs and off the wall energy, Steve Martin And Martin Short: An Evening You Will Forget For the Rest of Your Life is a nostalgic celebration of two comedy legends". Rolling Stone critic described the special as "Showbiz comfort food" adding that it "captures two veteran comedians resurrecting vaudeville-era schtick – and it feels so good". NPR described the special as "aggressively affable and very broad, and sometimes that's just what you need."

Awards and nominations

References

External links 
 
 

2018 films
2018 comedy films
2010s American films
2010s English-language films
American comedy films
English-language Netflix original films
Films directed by Marcus Raboy
Films shot in South Carolina
Netflix specials
Stand-up comedy concert films